is a metro station located in the city of Moriguchi, Osaka, Japan. It consists of the underground station operated by Osaka Metro and the elevated above-ground station operated by the Osaka Monorail,

Lines
Dainichi Station is a terminus of the underground Tanimachi Line, and is located 28.1 km from the opposing terminus of the line at Yaominami Station. The elevated Osaka Monorail Main Line is 19.9 kilometers from Osaka Airport Station.

Station layout
The station has one underground island platform serving two tracks and fenced with platform gates. The monorail station also has an island platform with platform gates.

Platforms
3F

B3F

Station building layout

Adjacent stations

History
 February 8, 1983: the Tanimachi Line subway station opened.
 August 22, 1997: Osaka Monorail Main Line opened.
 September 2001: the Sanyo Electric Dainichi factory closes.
 April 12, 2004: Dainichi station reopens on the former site of the Sanyo Factory
 September 21, 2006: New 2nd floor ticket window is added
 September 29, 2006: AEON Dainichi Shopping Center opens.
 November 21, 2011: AEON Dainichi Shopping Center is renamed AEON Mall Dainichi.

Passenger statistics
In fiscal 2019, the Osaka Metro station was used by an average of 33,719 passengers daily and the Osaka Monorail station by 5,242 passengers daily.

Surrounding area
ÆON Mall Dainichi
ÆON Dainichi
ÆON Cinema Dainichi
Panasonic Corporation
Osaka Municipal Transportation Bureau Dainichi Inspection Depot
Japan National Route 1 (Chuo Kanjosen)
Kinki Expressway
Osaka Prefectural Route 13: Kyoto Moriguchi Route

See also
List of railway stations in Japan

References

External links

 Official Site - Tanimachi Line 
 Official Site - Tanimachi Line 

Osaka Metro stations
Railway stations in Japan opened in 1983
Railway stations in Japan opened in 1997
Moriguchi, Osaka